Roland Calland (born 11 October 1946) is a New Zealand cricketer. He played in one first-class match for Northern Districts in 1977/78.

See also
 List of Northern Districts representative cricketers

References

External links
 

1946 births
Living people
New Zealand cricketers
Northern Districts cricketers
People from Paeroa
Cricketers from Waikato